Robert Lesley "Bob" Thomason, Jr. (born March 26, 1949) is a retired American college basketball coach. He coached the University of the Pacific Tigers men's basketball team for 25 seasons from 1988 to 2013.

In 25 years at Pacific, Thomason has the most wins in school and Big West history with 437. He was named Big West Conference Coach of the Year five times (1992–93, 1996–97, 2003–04, 2004–05 and 2005–06).

Early life and college playing career
Born in San Jose, California, Thomason graduated from Clayton Valley High School in Concord in 1967, where he played for coach Bruce Iverson.  Thomson then attended the University of the Pacific in Stockton. At Pacific, Thomason played shooting guard for the Pacific Tigers from 1968 to 1971. He graduated with a degree in physical education and was an All-West Coast Conference selection as a senior after leading Pacific to the 1971 NCAA tournament and averaging 17.2 points.

Coaching career
Thomason became an assistant coach at Stagg High School in Stockton in 1971. He then became head varsity basketball coach at Escalon High School in 1973 and Turlock High School in 1976. He led Turlock to the school's first conference title in 25 years.

In 1981, Thomason became head coach at Columbia College,  a junior college in Sonora, California. In four seasons at Columbia, Thomason had a 75–49 record and led Columbia to its first-ever Central Valley Conference title in 1985.

Thomason moved up to the NCAA Division III ranks as head coach at Cal State Stanislaus in 1985. In three seasons at Cal State Stanislaus, Thomason had a 52–27 record and led the school to a berth in the 1987 NCAA Tournament.

Thomason returned to Pacific to be head coach in 1988 and would stay for 25 seasons. With a 437–321 record, he led Pacific to five NCAA Tournament appearances and six Big West Conference regular season championships.

Head coaching record

*Includes a win by forfeit over California in 1994–95.

Notes

External links
 Pacific profile

1949 births
Living people
American men's basketball coaches
American men's basketball players
Basketball coaches from California
Basketball players from San Jose, California
Columbia Claim Jumpers men's basketball coaches
High school basketball coaches in the United States
Pacific Tigers men's basketball coaches
Pacific Tigers men's basketball players
People from Concord, California
People from Turlock, California
Shooting guards
Stanislaus State Warriors men's basketball coaches